The Aswārān (singular aswār), also spelled Asbārān and Savaran, was a cavalry force that formed the backbone of the army of the Sasanian Empire. They were provided by the aristocracy, were heavily armored, and ranged from archers to cataphracts.

Etymology
The word comes from the Old Persian word asabāra (from asa- and bar, a frequently used Achaemenid military technical term). The various other renderings of the word are following; Parthian asbār, Middle Persian aspabārak, Classical Persian suwār, uswār/iswār, Modern Persian savār. The Arabic word asāwira, used to refer to a certain faction of the Sasanian cavalry after the Muslim conquest, is a broken plural form of the Middle Persian aswār. However, the word aswār only means "horseman" in Middle Persian literature, and it is only the late Arabic term that has a more specialized meaning. In the Sassanian inscriptions, the formula asp ud mard (literally "horse and man") was commonly used to collectively refer to the cavalry and the infantry of the military.

Organization

The aswaran were primarily composed of Iranian aristocrats from the wuzurgan and the azadan, with members of the staff being from the former. After the reforms of Khosraw I, warriors from the dehqan class would also be enlisted.

The asbaran have often been demonstrated as an example of existence of feudalism in Iran by modern scholars, who simply refer them as either chevalier, knight, or ritter. According to historians such as Christensen and Widengren, the asbar had the same status as the knight. However, although the asbaran and knight resemble each other in many parts, the economic role and historical role of the knight is very different compared to the role of the asbaran in the Sasanian Empire, which thus makes it incorrect to refer the asbaran as knights.

The highest annual salary for each cavalryman was 4,000 dirhams.

Weaponry, armor, and tactics
The aswaran wore chainmail armor, and ranged from archers to cataphracts. They assumed a description with the bravery, tactics, and ethics of the Sasanians. They mastered in single combat in battles (mard o-mard), rode on elephants and horses, and their valor was recognized with ornamental emblems. Titles such as hazārmard ("whose strength is equal to one thousand men"), zih asbār ("superior rider"), and pahlawān-i gēhān ("hero/champion of the world"), were their epithets. They wrote the name of the Sasanian emperor and their valuable family members on their arrows as a good omen. They outperformed others in archery to the extent that later writers thought that they had introduced the profession. They were superior and unmatched in the profession, which was even acknowledged by their enemies. The major effectiveness of the Sasanian cavalry was noted by contemporaneous Roman writers, including Ammianus Marcellinus, and led the Romans to adopt aspects of Sasanian cavalry including their arms, armour and techniques.

Armor
The asbaran during this early period had much in common with their Parthian (Arsacid) predecessors, most of whom would have worn a scale armor cuirass with long sleeves and chaps covered in scale armor or, less often, plated mail. Their helmets, of the Spangenhelm type, would have been adapted throughout the Sasanian period.  Also horses would probably have had armored chests and heads, consisting of an apron and headpiece, or total body protection consisting of five separate pieces, made from either boiled leather or scale armor.  Some asbaran units such as mercenaries may have worn little to no armor at all, allowing them to be rather more swift, silent, and mobile.

Spangenhelm
The Spangenhelm helmets worn by members of the asbaran units in battle would have evolved through the centuries. During the 3rd-to-6th-century era of the Sassanian empire, the Spangenhelm  would have probably been made of felt and hardened leather. However, by the late 6th/early 7th century they would have been decorated with flowers and purple ball with mail and small areas through which to breathe and see.

Weaponry
The asbaran cavalry was armed with a variety of weapons. The traditional heavy cavalry weapons, such as maces, lances, and swords would have been used, as well as a variety of other weapons, such as axes. Asbaran cavalry were not, however, restricted to short-range weapons, as they often carried weapons such as darts and bows.

The Sasanian cavalry's weaponry has been listed by Libanius as darts, sabres (scimitars?), spears, swords and "a lance which needed both hands". The nawak arrow-guide was used to launch 10-40 cm long darts.

During Khosrow I's military reforms under Babak, a "list" for equipment for the cavalry was written. According to the Arabic and Persian sources of the Islamic period, the pieces of equipment for a regular Sasanian cavalryman were as follows:

The Sasanian lance was based on the 12-foot long Parthian kontos that featured a sword-like iron blade.

Face masks were used since at least the 4th century AD.

The horse-armor covered the torso (with an oval opening for the rider's seat), as well as the head and neck. Since stirrup was not invented yet, the riders were relying on a saddle with "four horn" design for their stability. The Sasanian cavalry was relying more on maneuverability than their Parthian predecessors.

The late aswaran reportedly also used a device called panjagan which was supposedly able to fire a volley of five arrows.

Banner

Each asbaran unit would have a Drafsh, or heraldric standard. These would have often included legendary creatures and animals. These animals would have included elephants, horses, bears, lions, deer (ahu); these would also include Zoroastrian mythological creatures such as Bashkuch and the army of asbaran would have the Derafsh Kaviani as their banner.

Some aswaran members with superior bravery, character, and equestrian skills were receiving honorary bracelets, recorded in Islamic sources as suwārī, with the wearer being called a musawwar.

Elite Aswaran

The aswaran sardar were high-ranking officers who were in charge of the aswaran, their position was so high up in  Sasanian society that they were only answerable to the Eran-Spahbad (Commander in Chief) and the Shahanshah himself. They would be guarded heavily by cataphract style cavalry. The post of aswaran sardar was held by a member of the Mihran-Pahlav family. Parts of the aswaran division were high-ranking including the Pushtigban Body Guards, a super heavy shock cavalry, who were the royal guards of the Shah himself. The influential aswaran cavalry were mostly made up of heavily armoured cavalry, generally composed of aristocracy or even from the imperial family themselves. There were also commanders who were elite as well. These parts of the aswaran regiments were kept as reserves.

After the fall of the Sasanians

Most of the asbaran was disbanded after suffering defeat and conquest during the Muslim conquest of Persia. However, several factions of the asbaran, each faction led by a different leader, defected to the Arabs in order to preserve their status and wealth. These asbaran factions settled in various places in the newly established Muslim territories, where they each become known by several names, the most known and prominent faction being the asawira, who under their leader Siyah settled in the newly established settlement of Basra.

See also

 Cataphract
 Clibanarii
 Asawira
 Sasanian army
 Byzantine army
 Late Roman army
 Roman-Persian Wars
 Persian war elephants
 Aspbed
 Spahbed
Furusiyya
Zhayedan

References

Sources

External links
 
 History of Iran: Sassanian Army
 Savārān - Google Search
 

Cavalry units and formations of the Sassanian Empire